Beta Indi, Latinized from β Indi, is the second brightest star in the southern constellation of Indus. It is visible to the naked eye as a faint, orange-hued point of light with an apparent visual magnitude of 3.67. The star is located approximately 600 light years from the Sun, based on parallax, but is drifting closer with a radial velocity of −5 km/s.

The stellar classification of this star is K1II, matching an evolved bright giant. Earlier it had been categorized as an ordinary giant with a class of K0III. Having consumed the supply of hydrogen at its core, this star has expanded off the main sequence and now has about 56 times the girth of the Sun. It is 53 million years old with 6.7 times the mass of the Sun. The star is radiating 1,183 times the Sun's luminosity from its enlarged photosphere at an effective temperature of 4,541 K.

β Indi has a visual companion, CCDM J20548-5827B, with an apparent visual magnitude of approximately 12.5. As of 2015, it lies at an angular separation of  along a position angle of 100° from the brighter component.

References

K-type bright giants
Indus (constellation)
Indi, Beta
PD-58 07788
198700
103227
7986